Lasha Parunashvili (born 14 February 1993) is a Georgian footballer who currently plays as a midfielder.

International career
Parunashvili made his debut for the national team in a friendly game against the Uzbekistan on 23 January 2017.

References

External links
  
 
 

1993 births
Living people
Footballers from Georgia (country)
Georgia (country) international footballers
Georgia (country) under-21 international footballers
Georgia (country) youth international footballers
Association football midfielders
FC Dinamo Tbilisi players
FC Saburtalo Tbilisi players
FC Metalurgi Rustavi players
FC Sioni Bolnisi players
FC Spartaki Tskhinvali players
Erovnuli Liga players
Expatriate men's footballers in Denmark
Esbjerg fB players
Danish Superliga players
Danish 1st Division players
Expatriate sportspeople from Georgia (country) in Denmark